Edward J. Hughes (July 26, 1888 – June 28, 1944) was an American politician.

Born in Chicago, Illinois, Hughes studied law and then switched to engineering. Hughes served in the Illinois State Senate from 1914 to 1930 as a Democrat. In 1932, Hughes was elected Illinois Secretary of State and served until his death. Hughes died of a heart attack on June 28, 1944, while staying at the Waldorf Astoria Hotel in New York City.

References

1888 births
1944 deaths
Politicians from Chicago
Secretaries of State of Illinois
Democratic Party Illinois state senators
20th-century American politicians